Bahşılı is a town and district of Kırıkkale Province in the Central Anatolia region of Turkey. At the 2000 Turkish census, the population of the district was 8,525, of whom 5,790 lived in the town of Bahşılı. According to the address-based, official population registration system made in 2019, the population of Bahşili is 7907.

Notes

References

External links
 District municipality's official website 

Populated places in Kırıkkale Province
Districts of Kırıkkale Province